Arkansas is a southern U.S. state.

Arkansas may also refer to:

Places in the United States
Arkansas, West Virginia
Arkansas, a misspelling of Arkansaw, Wisconsin, an unincorporated community
Arkansas City, Kansas
Arkansas City, Arkansas
Arkansas County, Arkansas
Arkansas Creek, a stream in Washington
Arkansas River, a tributary of the Mississippi River

Music
Arkansas (Glen Campbell album) 1975
 Arkansas (Bruce Hampton album), 1987
Arkansas (The Residents album), 2009
Arkansas (John Oates album), 2018
"Arkansas" (song), the state anthem of Arkansas, by Eva Ware Barnett
"Arkansas (You Run Deep in Me)", an alternative state song
"Arkansas", a song from the 1975 Glen Campbell album Arkansas

Ships
 , various US Navy ships
 , an ironclad warship in the American Civil War

Other uses
Arkansas (grape), another name for the grape Catawba
University of Arkansas
 Arkansas Razorbacks, this school's athletic program
Arkansas (film), a movie starring Vince Vaughn and Liam Hemsworth

See also

Arkansaw (disambiguation)
Arkanasa, an album by Bruce Hampton